Provat Lakra (born 12 August 1997) is an Indian professional footballer who plays as a defender for Indian Super League club NorthEast United. He mainly plays as a left-back, but can also play as a right-back.

Career

NorthEast United
On 10 May 2018, It was announced that the Indian Super League outfit NorthEast United have signed Provat Lakra on a three-year deal. 

In the 2021−22 season, he extends his contract with NorthEast United. By the end of the season Lakra made sixteen appearance for the Highlanders and plays an important role in the right back position for NorthEast United. Lakra renew his contract with NorthEast United for the 2022–23 season.

Career statistics

Club

References

Indian footballers
Living people
1997 births
Association football defenders
Gokulam Kerala FC players
NorthEast United FC players
Indian Super League players
I-League players
Footballers from West Bengal
Calcutta Football League players